The thirty-fourth series of the British medical drama television series Casualty began airing on BBC One in the United Kingdom on 17 August 2019, one week after the end of the previous series. The series consists of 43 episodes. Lucy Raffety continues her role as series producer, while Simon Harper continues his role as the show's executive producer; this is Raffety's final series as producer, and she was replaced by Loretta Preece. Production on the series was postponed in March 2020 due to the COVID-19 pandemic, which also resulted in multiple transmission breaks. A single episode was also pulled due to comparisons between its content and the pandemic; the episode was broadcast as the final episode of the series at a later date. The theme of the series is reflecting how the National Health Service (NHS) is "under pressure", with elements focusing on "the hierarchy of pressure on the doctors". The series is also promoted through multiple trailers.

Sixteen regular cast members reprised their roles from the previous series and five actors joined the cast. Additionally, Neet Mohan reprised his role as Rash Masum in the opening episode and Amanda Mealing returned to her role as Connie Beauchamp in episode 18 after a break from the series. Four cast members departed the show during the series, including original cast member Cathy Shipton (Lisa "Duffy" Duffin). Jane Hazlegrove reprised her role as Kathleen "Dixie" Dixon for two episodes and American actress Sharon Gless appeared as her recurring character, Zsa Zsa Harper-Jenkinson.

Production 
The thirty-fourth series consists of 43 episodes. Lucy Raffety continues her role as series producer while Simon Harper remains as the executive producer. Raffety's resignation from her position was announced on 16 April 2019, and she was replaced by Loretta Preece. Raffety and Preece were co-credited as series producer from episode 5, and Raffety confirmed that her stories would be broadcast until December.

Raffety previewed the series in an interview with Elaine Reilly of What's on TV, where she confirmed the theme of the series is "The NHS Under Pressure" and how the staff are working in a struggling environment. Harper echoed this, stating that the theme would be about "an NHS at critical breaking point". Preece also told Sophie Dainty of Digital Spy that the series would follow "the hierarchy of pressure on the doctors", in particular junior doctors such as Rash and Mason. Raffety told Reilly that the series would feature new stories for Dylan, Ethan and David, while Preece mentioned that Rash would experience a "moving journey" during the series. She also divulged that the series would also explore whether the NHS would be able to help Charlie and Duffy after they have "invested their whole adult lives" into the service. Preece stated that her plans for Casualty included "contemporary" guest artist stories and more comedy in the ED, while also creating more "action and drama".

It was announced on 18 March 2020 that production had been suspended on Casualty and other BBC Studios continuing dramas in light of government guidelines following the COVID-19 pandemic. A BBC Studios statement confirmed that there would be no impact on the immediate broadcast of episodes, but the "long-term ramifications are still unclear". The programme's Twitter account confirmed that episodes would broadcast for "as long as [they] can". An episode, which was planned to be episode 33 of the series and broadcast on 2 May 2020, was pulled from airing after being deemed "inappropriate" because of the pandemic. The following episode was brought forward to air in the slot. The pulled episode features the ED team dealing with a viral outbreak; scenes considered important to storylines were included in the catch-up section of the aired episode. Episode 42, which is the final episode filmed before production was suspended, was broadcast on 22 August 2020. Following this, the show entered a transmission break. It was announced on 16 September 2020 that the pulled episode would be broadcast as episode 43 on 26 September. Kate Oates, the head of continuing drama at BBC Studios, said that she was "proud" of the episode and "excited" to broadcast it and watch "the whole ED come together to tackle an invisible threat". Production of Casualty resumed in September 2020, but episodes recommenced with series 35.

Promotion 
The series was promoted through multiple trailers and each episode received a preview clip before broadcast. A trailer for the series was released on 14 August 2019, three days before the series premiere. It features segments from the early episodes of the series and Caitlin Butler of Digital Spy named the returns of Dixie and Rash, and a "tragic" story involving David and Oliver as highlights.

Cast 

The thirty-fourth series of Casualty features a cast of characters working in the emergency department of Holby City Hospital. The majority of the cast from the previous series continue to appear in this series. William Beck and George Rainsford appear as Dylan Keogh and Ethan Hardy, both consultants in emergency medicine. Jack Nolan portrays Will Noble, a consultant in pediatric emergency medicine, and Genesis Lynea features as Archie Hudson, an emergency medicine registrar. Longest-serving cast member Derek Thompson stars as Charlie Fairhead, the department's clinical nurse manager, senior charge nurse and emergency nurse practitioner, and Charles Venn portrays Jacob Masters, a charge nurse. The cast portraying the department's staff nurses are: Amanda Henderson (Robyn Miller, Jason Durr (David Hide), Gabriella Leon (Jade Lovall) and Shaheen Jafargholi (Marty Kirkby). Michael Stevenson and Maddy Hill play Iain Dean and Ruby Spark, both paramedics. Di Botcher plays operational duty manager and paramedic Jan Jenning, and Tony Marshall appears as Noel Garcia, the ED receptionist. Jacey Sallés portrays hospital porter Rosa Cadenas and Cathy Shipton stars as former nurse Duffy.

In May 2019, it was confirmed that Stevenson had finished filming and would be leaving the series. The actor expressed his pleasure at portraying Iain. Harper said he was "proud" of the actor's work on the show. Despite the departure originally being publicised as a break, Stevenson confirmed that he had left the cast, but the character was not killed off and could return. His final scenes were broadcast in episode 5. Shipton's departure from the show was announced on 9 October 2019, her final day of filming. The character was reported to leave at the conclusion of her dementia story. Shipton expressed her sadness at leaving and commented, "With sadness, but a sense of completion, I say goodbye." Harper praised Shipton for making Duffy "a comforting Saturday night icon, the caring, ideal NHS nurse millions grew up with". Shipton did not plan to stay for a long stint when she returned in series 31, and confirmed that the plot, which had been developing for two years, suited her decision not to stay. The character is killed off in episode 22. On killing-off the character, Harper said that he was proud to have "shone the most powerful light on a cruel disease". Rainsford confirmed on 20 November 2019 that he would be taking a short break from the drama; Ethan departs for a volunteer post in Costa Rica in episode 17. Rainsford explained that the timing of Ethan's departure was poor, but Ethan decides that "his needs [are] greater" and takes a break from the hospital to "clear his head". The character returns in episode 24 and receives a hostile response from Rash, which Rainsford confirmed is related to the series' theme. Lynea quit her role as Archie after a year on the drama and the character made her exit in episode 27. Her departure was not publicised prior to broadcast. After two years of appearing in the programme, Hill announced her departure from her role as Ruby in April 2020. Her final scenes aired in the thirty-first episode.

Neet Mohan returned to the drama in the opening episode, portraying Rash Masum, a foundation doctor, after a four-month break during the previous series. Actress Amanda Mealing also took a break from her role as consultant Connie Beauchamp during the previous series and will return during series 34. Her return airs in episode 18. On 7 August 2019, it was announced that Jane Hazlegrove would reprise her role as Kathleen "Dixie" Dixon for two episodes in the series as part of Iain's exit story. Dixie, a former paramedic and operational duty manager, returns as a Helicopter Emergency Medical Service paramedic. Harper expressed his delight at Dixie's return and called her "a massively popular character with the audience". The character appears in episodes 4 and 5.

Victor Oshin was cast as "over-confident" F1 doctor Mason Reede for the new series, and he is introduced in episode 2. Oshin was a regular cast member. Harper was impressed with Oshin from his first audition and praised the actor's performance, commenting, "He's brilliant as Mason, layering the character with a deep vulnerability beneath the bravado of a junior Doctor." Episode 18 features Oshin's exit from the drama as his character is killed off in an unannounced twist. The casting of Uriel Emil as Russian paramedic Lev Malinovsky was announced on 2 September 2019. The character, who is billed as "steely and tough but gentle at heart", is introduced as Iain's replacement and features in a big story during the series. Emil expressed his excitement at joining the cast. Harper described Lev as "fresh and unique" and commented that Emil portrayed the "troubled" Lev with "a fantastic, exciting energy". Producers then introduced advanced clinical practitioner (ACP) Faith Cadogan (Kirsty Mitchell), who was revealed to be Lev's wife, in episode 17. The characters feature in a new story when their son Luka Malinovsky (Tom Mulheron), who is introduced to the series, is diagnosed with a brain tumour. On 3 February 2020, it was announced that Stirling Gallacher had joined the cast as Ffion Morgan, a police officer and the wife of Jan. Gallacher expressed her delight at joining the cast and Harper stated that he was "excited" to explore the character and to have Gallacher portraying her. He confirmed that Ffion would be involved in "pretty turbulent" storylines. Fenisha Khatri (Olivia D'Lima) appears in episode 25 as a love interest for Ethan. She returns in episode 28 as a new paramedic, billed as "spirited, enthusiastic and brave".

The series features several recurring characters and multiple guest stars. Episode one features the return of David's son, Oliver Hide (Harry Collett), and former wife, Rosalene Hide (Lorraine Pilkington), as well as the first appearance of Kriss Dosanjh as Rash's father, Ashok Masum. The third episode of the series features an appearance from Rosie Marcel as Jac Naylor, a character in Casualty spin-off series, Holby City. Established actress Abigail Hardingham was cast in the series as guest character Effie Laurence, a love interest for Ethan. Effie is the daughter of Ethan's university friend, Theo Laurence (Jim Sturgeon), and has cystic fibrosis. Rainsford noted that the relationship would not be "without its issues as well". Hardingham and Sturgeon made their first appearances in episode two, and departed in episode 12 and 11, respectively. In November 2019, it was announced that actress Anna Savva had been cast to play Rosa's mother, Xiomara. Sallés described the character as "absolutely fabulous – but she's very meddlesome". The actress confirmed that Xiomara would arrive to put pressure on Rosa and David's relationship and soon befriends Ollie, who joins her in trying to get the pair married. That same month, a clip for Children in Need that was filmed by cast members teased the return of American actress Sharon Gless as Zsa Zsa Harper-Jenkinson, who has made three previous appearances on the drama. Her return was confirmed on 30 January 2020 by TVTimes, who reported that Dylan would call Zsa Zsa for help with Luka's brain tumour. Zsa Zsa makes a cameo appearance in episode 25, before guest starring in episode 26. Gless admitted that she did not expect to be invited back again as the timings were different to previous stints, so was pleased when the producers asked her. Kelly Gough was cast in a recurring role as Ruby's sister, Violette Spark, who was introduced in episode 16 for a new story for Ruby. Gough's stint on the drama ends in episode 25 when her character is killed off. As part of Duffy's story, actor Clive Wood reprised his role as Bill Crowthers, having appeared across five episodes in the previous series. Bill appears in episode 20. Episode 29 features an appearance from Alex Walkinshaw as director of nursing Adrian "Fletch" Fletcher, a character in Holby City. Also, Mealing confirmed that Jo Martin would appear as Max McGerry, a consultant in neurosurgery and the acting chief executive officer.

Main characters 

 William Beck as Dylan Keogh
 Di Botcher as Jan Jenning
 Olivia D'Lima as Fenisha Khatri
 Jason Durr as David Hide
 Uriel Emil as Lev Malinovsky
 Amanda Henderson as Robyn Miller
 Maddy Hill as Ruby Spark
 Shaheen Jafargholi as Marty Kirkby
 Gabriella Leon as Jade Lovall
 Genesis Lynea as Archie Hudson
 Tony Marshall as Noel Garcia
 Amanda Mealing as Connie Beauchamp
 Kirsty Mitchell as Faith Cadogan
 Neet Mohan as Rash Masum
 Jack Nolan as Will Noble
 Victor Oshin as Mason Reede
 George Rainsford as Ethan Hardy
 Jacey Sallés as Rosa Cadenas
 Cathy Shipton as Lisa "Duffy" Duffin
 Michael Stevenson as Iain Dean
 Derek Thompson as Charlie Fairhead
 Charles Venn as Jacob Masters

Recurring characters 

 Harry Collett as Oliver Hide
 Abigail Hardingham as Effie Laurence
 Stirling Gallacher as Ffion Morgan
 Kelly Gough as Violette Spark
 Tom Mulheron as Luka Malinovsky
 Jim Sturgeon as Theo Laurence

Guest characters 

 Kriss Dosanjh as Ashok Masum
 Sharon Gless as Zsa Zsa Harper-Jenkinson
 Jane Hazlegrove as Kathleen "Dixie" Dixon
 Rosie Marcel as Jac Naylor
 Lorraine Pilkington as Rosalene Hide
 Anna Savva as Xiomara Steadman
 Clive Wood as Bill Crowthers
 Jo Martin as Max McGerry

Episodes

See also 
Impact of the COVID-19 pandemic on television

Footnotes

References

External links 
 Casualty Series 34 at BBC Online
 Casualty series 34 at IMDb

34
2019 British television seasons
2020 British television seasons
Television productions suspended due to the COVID-19 pandemic